Northern Kentucky is the third-largest metropolitan area in the United States Commonwealth of Kentucky after Louisville and Lexington, and its cities and towns serve as the de facto "south side" communities of Cincinnati, Ohio. The three main counties of this metro area are Boone, Kenton, and Campbell along the Ohio River (shown in red on the map), with other counties also included. The label "Northern Kentucky" (abbreviated NKY) is used to demonstrate the common identity shared across county and city lines by the residents of these northern counties. Arguably, the label seeks to reverse the divisions that occurred to Campbell County, which, in 1794, included the land of Boone, Kenton, Pendleton Counties, and most of Bracken and Grant Counties. The urban and suburban areas of the northern counties are densely populated. Indeed, of Greater Cincinnati's over two million residents, 450,994 of them live in Northern Kentucky, with the three most northern counties contributing 394,163 residents themselves. The largest cities in each of the three most northern counties are Covington, Florence, and Fort Thomas.

On July 17, 2019, Brent Cooper, a member of the Northern Kentucky Chamber of Commerce, called for the Northern Kentucky community to consider reuniting the counties (Boone, Kenton, and Campbell) into one county to better reflect the region's common identity and strengthen its political voice and economic marketability.

Other, more rural counties often included in the wider or regional definition of Northern Kentucky are Gallatin, Grant, Pendleton, and Bracken (shown in pink on the map). Historically, Trimble, Mason, and Lewis County have also been included in the broader, regional definition of "Northern Kentucky".

Brief History

The area was served by ferry service across the Ohio River until the completion of the John A. Roebling Suspension Bridge (prototype of the famous Brooklyn Bridge) in 1866, whereupon land values in the areas near the river quadrupled overnight.

Beginning in the 1970s, many factors combined to create major growth. The proximity to Cincinnati, the completion of I-75, the nexus of rail service and river traffic, creation of several industrial parks, and the growth of Cincinnati/Northern Kentucky International Airport (CVG) (located near Hebron in northeastern Boone County near the Kenton County line) drew many industries into the area. Its geographically central location (within  of 80% of the US population) makes it ideal for distribution centers, and those shipping all over the country.

In addition to location, the Northern Kentucky area hosts several organizations which strive to enhance the quality of life and the local economy. The primary airport (CVG) serving Cincinnati is located in Northern Kentucky.

Attractions
Northern Kentucky contributes many attractions to the Greater Cincinnati community. Beyond the shops, restaurants, and riverside views of Cincinnati's skyline, some of the more well-known attractions are The Florence Speedway, MainStrasse Village, Newport on the Levee (including the Newport Aquarium), and the World Peace Bell. There are also several community playhouses and music venues, along with community parks, arboretums, and museums. Campbell County has some wineries.

Religious attractions of Northern Kentucky range from the historic churches of the older river cities, including the St. Mary's Cathedral Basilica of the Assumption and Mother of God Church, both in Covington, to the Ark Encounter in Williamstown, south in Grant County. Florence is home to the Islamic Center of Northern Kentucky.

Education
Northern Kentucky has several schools of higher education, including Gateway Community and Technical College, Northern Kentucky University, and Thomas More University.

Climate
Northern Kentucky is located within a climatic transition zone and is at the extreme northern limit of the humid subtropical climate. Evidence of both humid subtropical climate and humid continental climate can be found here, particularly noticeable by the presence of plants indicative of each climatic region; for example, the southern magnolia, and crape myrtle, from the subtropics and the blue spruce, maple, and eastern hemlock from cooler regions are successful landscape plants in and around Northern Kentucky. Some significant moderating variables for the overall climate of Northern Kentucky include: the Ohio River, the region's relatively large hills and valleys, and an urban heat influence due to the proximity of the Cincinnati/Northern Kentucky metropolitan area. The common wall lizard, introduced from Italy in the 1950s, is an example of fauna in the area that lends a subtropical ambiance to areas near the urban core of Cincinnati. Northern Kentucky is considered to be within the periphery of both the Midwest and the Upland South.

Demographics

References

External links

Northern Kentucky Convention and Visitors Bureau

Geography of the Cincinnati metropolitan area
Regions of Kentucky